The Building is a 1999 Vietnamese drama film directed by Việt Linh. It was entered into the 21st Moscow International Film Festival.

Cast
 Don Duong
 Hong Anh
 Mai Thanh
 Minh Trang

References

External links
 

1999 films
1999 drama films
Vietnamese-language films
Vietnamese drama films